Fröschl is a surname. Notable people with the name include:

Alexander Fröschl (born 1992), Austrian footballer
Karl Fröschl (born 1926), Austrian former sports shooter
Thomas Fröschl (born 1988), Austrian footballer
Wiguleus Fröschl of Marzoll (1445–1517), German nobleman